Return of the Loving Dead is the fifth studio album by the Danish psychobilly band the Nekromantix, released in 2002 by Hellcat Records. It was the band's first release on the American record label and their first to be widely distributed in the United States, and a music video was filmed for the single "Gargoyles Over Copenhagen." After this release band leader Kim Nekroman relocated to Los Angeles, California while the remaining members, brothers Peter and Kristian Sandorff, remained in Denmark.

Track listing
All songs written by Gaarde/Sandorff/Sandorff
"Nice Day for a Resurrection" - 4:23
"Who Killed the Cheerleader" - 4:09
"Nekronauts" - 3:31
"Subcultural Girl" - 4:13
"Gargoyles Over Copenhagen" - 3:57
"Trick or Treat" - 4:16
"Murder for Breakfast" - 3:07
"Rubbermonks & Leathernuns" - 3:58
"Generation 666" - 3:25
"Return of the Loving Dead" - 5:25
"I'm a Hellcat" - 2:55
"Haunted Cathouse" - 4:44
"Nekronomicon" - 6:59

Performers
Kim Nekroman - double bass, vocals
Peter Sandorff - guitar, backing vocals
Kristian Sandorff - drums

Album information
Record label: Hellcat Records
All songs written by Gaarde/Sandorff/Sandorff.

Nekromantix albums
2002 albums